Kamnev is a rural locality (a khutor) in Kapustinoyarsky Selsoviet of Akhtubinsky District, Astrakhan Oblast, Russia. The population was 43 as of 2010. There is 1 street.

Geography 
Kamnev is located 78 km northwest of Akhtubinsk (the district's administrative centre) by road. Grachi is the nearest rural locality.

References 

Rural localities in Akhtubinsky District